The Mad Room is a 1969 American horror and drama film directed by Bernard Girard, and starring Stella Stevens, Shelley Winters, Skip Ward, Carole Cole, Severn Darden, Beverly Garland, Michael Burns, and Barbara Sammeth. It is a loose remake of the 1941 film Ladies in Retirement, which had been adapted from a 1940 play of the same title written by Reginald Denham and Edward Percy.

The film was released by Columbia Pictures on May 1, 1969.

Plot
Ellen Hardy, working as a live-in assistant to wealthy widow Mrs. Armstrong, gets a call from the mental institution where her younger brother George and sister Mandy have been living since they were accused of killing their parents when they were six and four years old. George is turning 18, and rather than send him and Mandy to an adult facility, Ellen takes them back to live with her in Mrs. Armstrong's large house. Afraid of what their reception would be if the others knew the truth, Ellen conceals their dangerous history.

Upon arriving at the house, Mandy insists that she and George have a designated "mad room," a place where they can go to be alone when they are frustrated. Ellen reluctantly agrees to give them access to the former Mr. Armstrong's study despite the fact that Mrs. Armstrong refuses to let anyone in it. One night Mrs. Armstrong discovers Mandy in the study, and confronts Ellen about her mounting suspicion that they are keeping something from her. While Mandy and George eavesdrop from outside the room, Ellen finally breaks down under her questioning and tells Mrs. Armstrong about their grim childhood and the suspicion that either George, Mandy, or the both of them had killed their parents with a butcher knife. Mrs. Armstrong explains to Ellen that she can't keep the children at the house anymore, and goes to bed frightened.

The following morning, Ellen screams when she discovers Mrs. Armstrong dead in the "mad room," slashed by a saber. Mandy and George run to the scene, and both scream in horror and accuse each other of being the murderer. After another incident at the house, George and Mandy begin to find Ellen's ability to lie unsettling and suspect her of killing Mrs. Armstrong as well as their parents.

Ellen's nerves begin to fray, and tries to convince her fiancé Sam, the stepson of Mrs. Armstrong, that they should send the children away. She finally snaps after seeing that the family dog has discovered the dismembered body of Mrs. Armstrong and has brought a single hand out into the yard. She kills the dog and in the final scene is discovered by Sam, kneeling in the basement by the furnace as she once did the night she murdered her parents.

Cast
 Stella Stevens as Ellen Hardy
 Shelley Winters as Mrs. Armstrong
 Skip Ward as Sam Aller
 Carole Cole as Chris
 Severn Darden as Nate
 Beverly Garland as Mrs. Racine
 Michael Burns as George Hardy
 Barbara Sammeth as Mandy Hardy
 Lloyd Haynes as Dr. Marion Kincaid
 Jennifer Bishop as Mrs. Ericson
 Gloria Manon as Edna
 Lou Kane as Armand Racine

Release

Home media
The Mad Room was released for the first time on DVD by SPHE on March 4, 2011.

Reception

Critical response for The Mad Room has been mixed to negative.
 
Variety noted the acting, and scenery as being the better part of the film, but criticized the film's weak story, predictable plot twist, and tendency towards melodrama. Time Out called the film "disastrously renovated for contemporary consumption", and noted the film as being routine.

Alternately, Howard Thompson of The New York Times gave the film a positive review. Thompson praised the film for its acting, direction, tension, and cinematography; calling it "a fine suspense-shocker" Paul Mavis from DVD Talk awarded the film 3.5 out of 5 stars, writing "Not "horrific" by today's standards, but acceptably frightening and strange, with some nice direction and strong performances by the cast, particularly the underrated Stella Stevens. Fans of the two stars, and appreciators of the genre from this time period, will certainly enjoy this."

References

External links
 
 
 
 
 

1969 films
1969 horror films
1969 drama films
American horror drama films
Remakes of American films
American films based on plays
Columbia Pictures films
Films directed by Bernard Girard
Films scored by Dave Grusin
Films set in country houses
Films shot in British Columbia
Films based on adaptations
1960s English-language films
Films with screenplays by Garrett Fort
Films about siblings
Patricide in fiction
Matricide in fiction
1960s American films